Barons Court was a constituency of the House of Commons of the Parliament of the United Kingdom from 1955 to 1974. It was represented by one Member of Parliament (MP), elected by the first-past-the-post system of election.

Boundaries 

Barons Court was a borough constituency of the parliamentary County of London. It was created from parts of three abolished constituencies in 1955: the bulk of Hammersmith South and parts of Fulham West and Fulham East. It was composed of the northern end of the Metropolitan Borough of Fulham (Barons Court, Margravine, and Lillie wards) and the southern section of the Metropolitan Borough of Hammersmith (Broadway, Brook Green, Grove, and Ravenscourt wards). It did not include the whole of either Metropolitan Borough.

When local government in London was reformed in 1965, the area became part of the London Borough of Hammersmith in Greater London. This did not affect the parliamentary boundaries until 1974. In that year constituencies were redrawn to correspond to wards of the London Borough: the Barons Court constituency was divided between the seats of Fulham and Hammersmith North.

Members of Parliament

Elections

Elections in the 1950s

Elections in the 1960s

Elections in the 1970s

See also 
 Former United Kingdom Parliament constituencies

References

Sources 
 Boundaries of Parliamentary Constituencies 1885-1972, compiled and edited by F.W.S. Craig (Parliamentary Reference Publications 1972)
 British Parliamentary Election Results 1950-1973, compiled and edited by F.W.S. Craig (Parliamentary Research Services 1983)
 Who's Who of British Members of Parliament, Volume IV 1945-1979, edited by M. Stenton and S. Lees (Harvester Press 1981)

Parliamentary constituencies in London (historic)
Constituencies of the Parliament of the United Kingdom established in 1955
Constituencies of the Parliament of the United Kingdom disestablished in 1974
Politics of the London Borough of Hammersmith and Fulham
History of the London Borough of Hammersmith and Fulham